Lourdes Domínguez Lino and Beatriz García Vidagany were the defending champions, but García Vidagany chose not to participate. Domínguez Lino partnered Mariana Duque but lost in the first round.

Tatiana Búa and Laura Thorpe won the title, defeating Nicole Melichar and Maryna Zanevska in the final, 6–3, 3–6, [10–6].

Seeds

Draw

References 
 Draw

2015 ITF Women's Circuit